Total Control is an Australian television political drama series first screened on ABC TV in October 2019. Its working title was Black Bitch, but that was deemed too controversial and the series was renamed. Season 2 began airing on 7 November 2021. On 31 August 2022, a third season was announced by Screen Australia.

Synopsis
Rachel Anderson is the embattled but cunning Prime Minister of Australia. Alex is a charismatic Indigenous woman who finds herself the centre of media attention following her admirable actions in a high-risk situation. Rachel wants to use Alex to boost her popularity and further her own agenda, and recruits her as a senator.

The government in the series appears to represent the Liberal-National coalition, with various factions and other parties mimicking current ones in Australia. There are several storylines and characters, including Alex's son, her mother, an ex-lover and rival clans in Winton, Queensland, her activist brother in the city, various other players in the Canberra political and office sphere, and a young woman who has escaped youth detention with some footage which could severely damage the government, or in particular the right-wing faction.

Cast and characters
Main Cast
Deborah Mailman as Alexandra "Alex" Irving, Coalition Senator for Queensland (Series 1) and now independent MP for the seat of Freeman, Queensland (Series 2).
 Rachel Griffiths as Rachel Anderson, the Prime Minister of Australia (Series 1) and now independent MP for the seat of North Sydney, New South Wales (Series 2).
Harry Richardson as Jonathan Cosgrove, former staffer in the Prime Minister's Office and chief advisor to Senator Irving (Series 1).
 Rob Collins as Charlie Irving, Alex's brother who worked as a university lecturer in Sydney (Series 1) and who now heads up Alex's campaign for the seat of Freeman (Series 2).
 Anthony Hayes as Damian Bauer, Minister for Immigration (Series 1) and now the Prime Minister of Australia (Series 2).
 William McInnes as Laurie Martin, Leader of the Australian Labor Party and Leader of the Opposition (Series 1 and 2).
Huw Higginson as Peter Solomon, Chief of Staff to the Prime Minister. 
 Wesley Patten as Eddie Irving, Alex's son.
Series 1

 Trisha Morton-Thomas as Jan Irving, Alex's mother
Aaron Pedersen as Tom Campbell Jnr., a friend and former flame of Alex.
 David Roberts as Kevin Cartwright, Minister for Indigenous Affairs
 Val Weldon as Marcie Maclean, an inmate at the Macauley Detention Centre who is killed by a guard
 Shantae Barnes Cowan as Jess Clarke, an inmate at the Macauley Detention Centre who escapes after her friend is killed
 Celia Ireland as Tracey Helliar
 James Sweeny as Christopher Bingham
 Adele Perovic as Jillian Morell
 Tony Barry as Phillip Anderson, Rachel's father
 Rebecca Massey as Sharon, a Child and Youth Protection Services worker in Canberra
Luke Carroll as Rob, a member of Alex's extended family.
Fran Kelly as herself.
Patricia Karvelas as herself.

Series 2
Wayne Blair as Paul Murphy, Laurie Martin's 'offsider' who has ambitions of becoming the first Indigenous Prime Minister of Australia.
Hamish MacDonald as himself.
Colin Friels as Jack Ramsay, the incumbent Coalition MP for the seat of Freeman, Queensland.
Jason King as Scott McNally, the Labor candidate for the seat of Freeman, Queensland.
Angela Fitzpatrick as Gloria Vincent, the independent Christian candidate for the seat of Freeman, Queensland.
Tasneem Roc as Mima Scott, the Coalition candidate for the seat of North Sydney, New South Wales.
Tom Dawson as Henry Whittacker, a political staffer in Prime Minister Bauer's media office who has been engaged in an racially-motivated hate campaign against Alex under the pseudonym 'Bait15'.

Episodes

Series Overview

Series 1 (2019)

Series 2 (2021)

Production
The working title of the series was Black Bitch; however, it was changed after complaints that the title was a racial slur. The first season was written by Stuart Page, Angela Betzien, Pip Karmel and directed by Rachel Perkins. It was produced by Darren Dale and Miranda Dear for Blackfella Films with Rachel Griffiths, Kelrick Martin and Sally Riley as executive producers. The six-part first season was filmed in Canberra, Sydney and Winton in Central West Queensland. New music was written and recorded by Missy Higgins and featured in the series.

Season 2 was directed by Wayne Blair, while writing credits include Stuart Page, Larissa Behrendt, Angela Betzien, Pip Karmel and Nakkiah Lui. Some scenes were filmed on location in Parliament House, Canberra as well as Sydney and Broken Hill.

Release 
In advance of the broadcast premiere of Season 1 on ABC TV in October 2019, several episodes of the series received a preview screening in the Primetime program of the 2019 Toronto International Film Festival.

Season 2 aired from 7 November 2021.

Critical reception
The first season received mixed to positive reviews from critics. The dialogue, writing, relationships between the characters, and Alex's characterisation were widely praised, but recurring criticisms were that the series lacked action and the storytelling was too meek and subdued despite its intense subject matter. However, the cast's performances received critical acclaim, especially Deborah Mailman's.

The series has an approval rating of 100% percent for its first season on the review aggregator website Rotten Tomatoes indicating critical acclaim.

Craig Mathieson of The Sydney Morning Herald wrote "It's hard to remember the last time an Australian drama had dialogue as biting, juicy, and telling as the lines that ricochet back and forth – simultaneously revealing power and defining personalities" and that Mailman gives a "full-tilt and full-bodied performance". Luke Buckmaster of The Guardian said "There are times when it feels like we may be in store for a Bulworth-style spectacle, revolving around a shoot-from-the-hips political newbie with nothing to lose. However, the drama in Total Control is meeker than that, and the stakes feel surprisingly low, given several hot-button issues explored". Buckmaster praised the performances of both Mailman and Trisha Morton-Thomas. He declared Mailman's performance to be "superb" and said that she was the series' "one unquestionably outstanding element".

Chris Boyd from Screenhub wrote: "As an action drama, Total Control is unconvincing and poorly executed. As a political thriller, it's sketchy and forced. The Canberra intrigue is shallow to the point of parody." However he praised the performances of both Mailman and Rob Collins. When it comes to Mailman's performance he said "Increasingly blunt, and foul-mouthed, Mailman is electrifying. Tectonic. Unforgettable." Laura Brodnik from Mamamia gave the series a positive review saying "with a cutting and topical script, this is a series that secures a spot as one of the best Australian offerings of the year". Brodnik praised most of the cast but singled out Mailman and Shantae Barnes Cowan for the most praise. She called Mailman's performance a "stand out". And said Barnes Cowan "delivers some of the shows most emotional moments in scenes that are light on dialogue, so it's left up to her facial expressions to convey the gravity of what is really going on".

Dorothy Rabinowitz of The Wall Street Journal wrote a glowing review, saying this about the series "It's an enterprise mightily enlarged by its merciless focus on political combat, its depiction of longtime trusted alliances, its biting vision of the prevailing codes, and what passes for right and wrong in political society." James Croot from Stuff NZ wrote: "Total Control offers a scathing examination of Australian politics [and] a clarion call for social justice." He went onto praise the series' music, saying it was "a magnificent showcase for the songwriting and singing skills of Missy Higgins", Alex's characterisation ("Her character is a compelling, complex and charismatic presence, a woman passionate about representing her community, but still traumatised by the event that made her public property") and Rachel Griffiths' performance ("Griffiths is impressive as the embattled Prime Minister, struggling to keep her party (and herself) in power – two goals that aren’t necessarily the same thing.").
Joel Keller from Decider praised the writing of the series, saying "The writing in all of those scenes, is sharp and intelligent, not giving in to cliché or tropes" and that "the writing is smart enough to give its audience credit for having some brain cells to process the story". He added "after the ace performances by Mailman and Griffiths, we're looking forward to seeing what direction Total Control goes in".

References

External links

 

Television shows set in Sydney
2019 Australian television series debuts
Television shows set in Australian Capital Territory
Television shows set in Queensland
Australian Broadcasting Corporation original programming
English-language television shows
Australian political drama television series
Indigenous Australian television series